The 2011 WNBA season is the 14th season for the Washington Mystics of the Women's National Basketball Association.

Transactions

WNBA Draft
The following are the Mystics' selections in the 2011 WNBA Draft.

Transaction log
February 7: The Mystics signed Maurita Reid to a training camp contract.
March 29: The Mystics signed Sequoia Holmes and Angel Robinson to training camp contracts.
April 8: The Mystics signed Megan Frazee.
April 8: The Mystics signed Bernice Mosby to a training camp contract.
April 9: The Mystics traded their first-round 2012 Draft pick to the Minnesota Lynx in exchange for Nicky Anosike.
April 11: The Mystics traded Lindsey Harding and a second-round pick in the 2012 Draft to the Atlanta Dream in exchange for Kelly Miller, draft rights to Ta'Shia Phillips and a first-round pick in the 2012 Draft.
April 29: The Mystics traded Katie Smith and Jacinta Monroe to the Seattle Storm in exchange for Jasmine Thomas and a first-round pick in the 2012 Draft, and the Indiana Fever's third-round pick in the 2012 Draft.
May 2: The Mystics waived Bernice Mosby.
May 17: The Mystics waived Sequoia Holmes and Maurita Reid.
May 28: The Mystics waived Chasity Melvin and Angel Robinson.
May 31: The Mystics waived Ashley Houts and Megan Frazee.
June 9: The Mystics signed Kerri Gardin to an emergency hardship contract.
June 20: The Mystics waived Kerri Gardin.
June 23: The Mystics signed Joy Cheek to an emergency hardship contract.
July 6: The Mystics waived Joy Cheek.
July 7: The Mystics signed Kerri Gardin to an emergency hardship contract.
July 21: The Mystics waived Ta'Shia Phillips and Karima Christmas.
July 25: The Mystics signed DeMya Walker.

Trades

Personnel changes

Additions

Subtractions

Roster

Depth

Season standings

Schedule

Preseason

|- align="center" bgcolor="bbffbb"
| 1 || May 25 || 10:30am || @ New York || 60–57 || Anosike (14) || Melvin (6) || Miller (5) || Prudential Center  6,472 || 1-0
|- align="center" bgcolor="bbffbb"
| 2 || May 26 || 11:30am || Chicago || 66–55 || Langhorne (15) || Langhorne (9) || Thomas (3) || Verizon Center  9,502 || 1–1
|-

Regular season

|- align="center" bgcolor="ffbbbb"
| 1 || June 4 || 7:00pm || @ Connecticut ||  || 73–89 || AnosikeLanghorne (16) || Anosike (7) || AjavonMiller (4) || Mohegan Sun Arena  6,666 || 0–1
|- align="center" bgcolor="bbffbb"
| 2 || June 9 || 7:00pm || @ Atlanta || ESPN2 || 98–90 (OT) || Langhorne (30) || AnosikeLanghorne (13) || Miller (5) || Philips Arena  5,020 || 1–1
|- align="center" bgcolor="ffbbbb"
| 3 || June 11 || 7:00pm || Chicago || CN100 || 77–84 || Ajavon (24) || Coleman (6) || AjavonMiller (4) || Verizon Center  11,943 || 1–2
|- align="center" bgcolor="ffbbbb"
| 4 || June 16 || 7:00pm || Connecticut || CSN-MA || 71–79 || Miller (19) || Anosike (13) || Miller (5) || Verizon Center  7,028 || 1–3
|- align="center" bgcolor="ffbbbb"
| 5 || June 18 || 8:00pm || @ Tulsa ||  || 59–77 || ColemanLanghorne (12) || Langhorne (12) || Ajavon (4) || BOK Center  4,423 || 1–4
|- align="center" bgcolor="ffbbbb"
| 6 || June 21 || 7:00pm || Indiana || CSN-MA || 80–89 || Langhorne (23) || Langhorne (9) || Anosike (4) || Verizon Center  7,980 || 1–5
|- align="center" bgcolor="bbffbb"
| 7 || June 28 || 4:00pm || Tulsa || CSN-MA || 83–63 || Langhorne (23) || Coleman (12) || Ajavon (6) || Verizon Center  10,675 || 2–5
|-

|- align="center" bgcolor="ffbbbb"
| 8 || July 3 || 4:00pm || Seattle || NBATVCSN-MA || 63–73 || Dunlap (19) || Anosike (10) || AjavonMiller (4) || Verizon Center  11,604 || 2–6
|- align="center" bgcolor="ffbbbb"
| 9 || July 5 || 8:00pm || @ Chicago || CN100 || 65–78 || Coleman (14) || Anosike (10) || Thomas (4) || Allstate Arena  3,187 || 2–7
|- align="center" bgcolor="ffbbbb"
| 10 || July 9 || 7:00pm || @ Indiana ||  || 57–68 || Anosike (12) || Coleman (9) || Miller (4) || Conseco Fieldhouse  7,056 || 2–8
|- align="center" bgcolor="ffbbbb"
| 11 || July 12 || 3:00pm || @ Seattle || NBATV || 71–79 || Coleman (16) || Coleman (9) || Ajavon (7) || KeyArena  13,384 || 2–9
|- align="center" bgcolor="ffbbbb"
| 12 || July 15 || 10:00pm || @ Phoenix || NBATVFS-A || 64–78 || Langhorne (17) || Anosike (10) || AjavonColemanMiller (3) || US Airways Center  9,075 || 2–10
|- align="center" bgcolor="bbffbb"
| 13 || July 17 || 8:30pm || @ Los Angeles || NBATV || 89–85 (OT) || Ajavon (29) || Langhorne (14) || Langhorne (5) || Staples Center  10,398 || 3–10
|- align="center" bgcolor="ffbbbb"
| 14 || July 20 || 11:30am || Atlanta || NBATV || 79–86 || Langhorne (24) || Anosike (14) || Miller (6) || Verizon Center  13,954 || 3–11
|-
| colspan="11" align="center" valign="middle" | All-Star break
|- align="center" bgcolor="ffbbbb"
| 15 || July 26 || 7:00pm || San Antonio || CSN-MA || 67–73 || Langhorne (19) || Anosike (8) || Thomas (5) || Verizon Center  11,331 || 3–12
|- align="center" bgcolor="ffbbbb"
| 16 || July 28 || 7:00pm || @ New York || MSG || 71–75 || Langhorne (18) || Langhorne (9) || AnosikeColeman (3) || Prudential Center  6,808 || 3–13
|- align="center" bgcolor="ffbbbb"
| 17 || July 29 || 7:00pm || Indiana || NBATVCSN-MA || 59–61 || Ajavon (19) || Walker (10) || Ajavon (4) || Verizon Center  11,587 || 3–14
|-

|- align="center" bgcolor="bbffbb"
| 18 || August 6 || 7:00pm || New York || NBATV || 91-81 || Ajavon (32) || AnosikeLanghorne (9) || Ajavon (5) || Verizon Center  10,741 || 4–14
|- align="center" bgcolor="ffbbbb"
| 19 || August 9 || 7:00pm || Atlanta || CSN-MA || 70–72 || Ajavon (28) || Coleman (10) || Anosike (4) || Verizon Center  9,536 || 4–15
|- align="center" bgcolor="bbffbb"
| 20 || August 12 || 7:00pm || New York ||  || 64–63 || Langhorne (18) || Anosike (11) || AjavonColeman (3) || Verizon Center  10,092 || 5–15
|- align="center" bgcolor="ffbbbb"
| 21 || August 13 || 7:00pm || @ Connecticut ||  || 75–82 || Langhorne (17) || Anosike (7) || Miller (6) || Mohegan Sun Arena  6,717 || 5–16
|- align="center" bgcolor="ffbbbb"
| 22 || August 16 || 7:00pm || @ New York ||  || 66–69 || Langhorne (25) || Langhorne (6) || Ajavon (5) || Prudential Center  6,223 || 5–17
|- align="center" bgcolor="ffbbbb"
| 23 || August 18 || 7:00pm || Minnesota ||  || 62–81 || Ajavon (15) || ColemanLanghorneWalker (5) || Miller (4) || Verizon Center  9,483 || 5–18
|- align="center" bgcolor="ffbbbb"
| 24 || August 20 || 7:00pm || Chicago || NBATVCN100 || 70–71 || Ajavon (23) || Anosike (9) || AjavonThomas (4) || Verizon Center  10,273 || 5–19
|- align="center" bgcolor="ffbbbb"
| 25 || August 21 || 6:00pm || @ Indiana || NBATVFS-I || 51–83 || LanghorneThomas (11) || Langhorne (7) || Ajavon (3) || Conseco Fieldhouse  7,935 || 5–20
|- align="center" bgcolor="ffbbbb"
| 26 || August 23 || 7:00pm || Los Angeles || CSN-MA || 82–86 (OT) || Langhorne (28) || Langhorne (9) || Thomas (5) || Verizon Center  8,441 || 5–21
|- align="center" bgcolor="ffbbbb"
| 27 || August 26 || 8:30pm || @ Chicago || CN100 || 67–80 || Langhorne (19) || Langhorne (9) || Langhorne (5) || Allstate Arena  4,434 || 5–22
|- align="center" bgcolor="ffbbbb"
| 28 || August 28 || 4:00pm || Phoenix || CSN-MA || 79–86 || Langhorne (27) || Langhorne (12) || MillerThomas (5) || Verizon Center  11,614 || 5–23
|- align="center" bgcolor="ffbbbb"
| 29 || August 30 || 8:00pm || @ Minnesota ||  || 56–73 || Langhorne (13) || Anosike (7) || Thomas (3) || Target Center  8,065 || 5–24
|-

|- align="center" bgcolor="bbffbb"
| 30 || September 1 || 7:00pm || Atlanta ||  || 85–81 || Langhorne (25) || GardinLanghorne (10) || Thomas (5) || Verizon Center  7,954 || 6–24
|- align="center" bgcolor="ffbbbb"
| 31 || September 2 || 7:30pm || @ Atlanta || NBATV || 73-95 || Thomas (19) || Walker (8) || Miller (4) || Philips Arena  6,579 || 6–25
|- align="center" bgcolor="ffbbbb"
| 32 || September 4 || 4:00pm || Connecticut || NBATVCSN-MA || 48–79 || Currie (13) || Gardin (10) || MillerThomas (2) || Verizon Center  13,403 || 6–26
|- align="center" bgcolor="ffbbbb"
| 33 || September 7 || 7:00pm || @ Indiana || NBATV || 69-87 || Langhorne (18) || Langhorne (15) || Ajavon (3) || Conseco Fieldhouse  8,514 || 6–27
|- align="center" bgcolor="ffbbbb"
| 34 || September 10 || 8:00pm || @ San Antonio || NBATV || 74–82 || Ajavon (15) || AnosikeLanghorne (9) || Ajavon (5) || AT&T Center  12,813 || 6–28
|-

| All games are viewable on WNBA LiveAccess or ESPN3.com

Statistics

Regular season

Awards and honors
Crystal Langhorne was named to the 2011 WNBA All-Star Team as a reserve.

References

External links

Washington Mystics seasons
Washington
Washington Mystics